Ogliuga Island is an island in the Delarof Islands subgroup of the Andreanof Islands in the Aleutian Islands chain of Alaska.

There is an abandoned US military airfield named Ogliuga Island Army Airfield on the island after World War II.

On Ogliuga, and on other islands of the Fox and Andreanof groups, the emperor goose is found in winter.

References

External links

Delarof Islands
Islands of Alaska
Islands of Unorganized Borough, Alaska